GMY may refer to:

 Guaymaral Airport, in Colombia
 Goodmayes railway station, in London
 Mycenaean language